Bruce Eric Castle is a New Zealand rugby league footballer who represented New Zealand.

Playing career
Castle played for the Ellerslie Eagles. In 1966 he won the Rothville Trophy as the Auckland Rugby League competition player of the year.

He also represented Auckland and was part of victories over Australia in 1961 and Great Britain in 1962.

Castle played two test matches for the New Zealand national rugby league team, including one as captain.

Coaching career
Castle was the player-coach for Turvey Park in Wagga Wagga before coaching the Mangere East Hawks in the Auckland Rugby League competition.

Later years
Castle was a selector for the New Zealand national rugby league team between 1999 and 2001.

Personal life
His wife, Marlene Castle, is a four-times New Zealand Commonwealth Games lawn bowls representative.

His daughter, Raelene Castle, is a sports administrator who served as the Chief Executive Officer of Netball New Zealand and the Canterbury-Bankstown Bulldogs before becoming CEO of Rugby Australia in December 2017.

References

Living people
New Zealand rugby league administrators
New Zealand rugby league players
New Zealand national rugby league team players
Auckland rugby league team players
Ellerslie Eagles players
New Zealand national rugby league team captains
Rugby league locks
Year of birth missing (living people)
Place of birth missing (living people)
New Zealand rugby league coaches
Mangere East Hawks coaches